"Falsetto" is the second single from The-Dream's debut studio album, Love/Hate. The song is produced by Christopher "Tricky" Stewart and was released on September 28, 2007.

Music video
The music video, most of which was filmed in Las Vegas, Nevada, premiered November 28, 2007 on MTV's TRL, followed by BET's 106 & Park on December 5, 2007.

Charts

Weekly charts

Year-end charts

References

2007 singles
The-Dream songs
Songs written by The-Dream
Songs written by Tricky Stewart
Song recordings produced by Tricky Stewart
2007 songs
Def Jam Recordings singles